Sujata Sridhar (b. 25 December 1961) is a former Test and One Day International cricketer who represented India. She played a total of three Tests and six ODIs and represented Tamil Nadu and Karnataka in India's domestic leagues.

References

Living people
1961 births
People from Tamil Nadu
Indian women cricketers
India women Test cricketers
India women One Day International cricketers
Tamil Nadu women cricketers
Karnataka women cricketers